This is a list of radio stations in the Americas.

Argentina
 CNN Radio Argentina - 950 AM Buenos Aires
 FM La Boca - 90.1 FM Buenos Aires
 FM Federal - 99.5 FM Buenos Aires
 Radio Nacional de Argentina - 870 AM Buenos Aires
 R. Nacional Clasica
 R. Nacional Folclorica
 R. Nacional Rock
 RAE - Radiodifusion Argentina al Exterior - Shortwave
 Radio 10 - 710 AM Buenos Aires
 Radio ASPEN - 102.3 FM Buenos Aires
 Radio Continental - 590 AM Buenos Aires
 Radio Jai - 96.3 FM Buenos Aires
 Radio Rivadavia - 630 AM Buenos Aires
 Radio Rock & Pop - 95.9 FM Buenos Aires
 Radio Mitre - 790 AM Buenos Aires
 Radio La 100 - 99.9 Buenos Aires
 Radio Disney - 94.3 Buenos Aires
 Radio Pop - 101.5 Buenos Aires
 Radio 40 Principales - 105.5 Buenos Aires

Barbados

Belize

Bolivia

Beni Department 
 Radio San Miguel - 99.1 FM & 4700 SW Riberalta
 Radio Santa Ana del Yacuma - 4451 kHz

Chuqisaca Department 
 Radio Camargo - 100,1 FM Camargo
 Radio Encuentro - 96.1 FM & 920 AM Sucre
 Radio Sucre - 1320 AM Sucre

Cochabamba Department 
 Radio Clasica - 100.3 FM Cochabamba
 Radio Estrella - 93.1 FM Cochabamba
 Radio Kawchasun Coca - 99.1 FM Cochabamba / 91.5 FM Valle Alto
 Radio Maria - 106.5 FM La Paz / 101.9 FM Cochabamba / 95.9 FM Yapacani / 97.5 FM Santa Cruz
 Radio Mega - 89.9 FM Cochabamba
 Radio Mosoj Chaski - 3310 SW Cochabamba (Quechua Language Christian Radio)
 Radio El Sonido de Vida - 24.7 FM Comunicación con Vida (emisora cristiana) Cochabamba

La Paz Department 
 Radio Black Rabbit (Blues, Blues-Rock)
 Doble 8 Radio - 88.5 FM La Paz
 Erbol FM - 100.9 FM La Paz
 FM Bolivia - 101.3 FM (94.9?) Chulumani
 Majestad FM - 105.7 FM La Paz (Christian Radio)
 Radio Bendita Trinidad - 1540 AM El Alto / 1480 AM 
 Radio Chacaltaya - 93.7 FM La Paz (Cumbia & Popular Music)
 Radio Cruz del Sur - 95.3 FM & 720 AM La Paz
 Radio El Sonido de la Vida - 89.3 FM La Paz (Christian Radio)
 Radio Estelar - 92.5 FM La Paz
 Radio Fides - 101.3 FM & 6155 SW La Paz
 Radio Jallalla Coca - 100.1 FM & 680 AM Chulumani
 Radio Metropolitana - 940 AM La Paz
 Radio Mundial - 97.7 FM La Paz
 Radio Nueva Estrella - 98.7 FM La Paz
 Radio Pachamama - 106.0 FM El Alto
 Radio Panamericana - 96.1 FM, 580 AM & 6105 SW La Paz
 Radio Pasion Boliviana - 107.3 FM La Paz (Bolivian Music)
 Radio Patria Nueva - 94.3 FM, 1020 AM & 6025 SW La Paz (National Public Radio with National Coverage)
 Radio Play - 107.5 FM & 800 AM La Paz
 Radio Poder de Dios - 93.1 FM (90.1 FM?) La Paz
 Radio Qhana - 105.3 FM La Paz
 Radio Kawsachun Coca - 98.8 FM La Paz
 Radio RKM - 90.9 FM La Paz
 Radio Splendid - 1220 AM La Paz
 Radio Uchumachi - 103.7 FM Coroico
 Radio Yungas - 92.1 FM & 730 AM Chulumani

Oruro Department 
 Radio Caliente 97.5 FM Oruro (Tropical Music)
 Radio Pio XII - 99.7 FM Oruro / 97.9 FM Cochabamba / 710 AM & 5952 SW Siglo Veinte (Broadcasts also in Quechua & Aymara Languages)
 WKM Radio 91.3 FM Oruro
 Radio Transamericana FM Oruro, Bolivia.]

Potosi Department 
 Radio Kollasuyo - 105.1 FM & 960 AM Potosi
 Radio Yura - 4717 SW Yura

Santa Cruz Department 
 Classica FM - 106.9 FM Santa Cruz de la Sierra (Adult Contemporary Music)
 Radio Activa - 91.9 FM Santa Cruz de la Sierra
 Radio Atlantica - 88.9 FM Santa Cruz de la Sierra
 Radio Betania - 93.7 FM Santa Cruz
 Radio Disney Bolivia - 98.7 FM Santa Cruz, 102.5 FM La Paz & 107.5 FM Cochabamba
 Radio Integración - 90.3 FM Montero, Sta Cruz.
 Radio Omega - 99.9 FM Montero, Sta Cruz.
 Radio Manantial - 99.7 FM Santa Cruz de la Sierra (Christian Radio)
 Radio Santa Cruz - 6135 AM Santa Cruz de la Sierra

Tarija Department 
 Horizonte FM - 94.9 FM Tarija
 Radio Guadalquivir - 91.5 FM &1420 AM Tarija
 Radio Libertad - 96.7 FM Tarija (Folklore Music)
 Radio Luis de Fuentes - 93.1 FM Tarija

Brazil

Current radio stations
88 FM - 88.7 FM - Rio de Janeiro - Religious
89 FM – 89.1 FM  – São Paulo - Rock
101 FM - 101.1 FM - Rio de Janeiro - Gospel
Alpha FM – 101.7 FM – Osasco, São Paulo - Adult contemporary and Musica popular brasileira
Antena 1 - 103.7 FM - Rio de Janeiro - Adult contemporary
Boa Vista FM – 96.5 FM – Paracatu, Minas Gerais
CBN – News Station – 24 affiliates throughout Brazil (a parent station of Globo, created in 1991)
Rio de Janeiro – 860 AM and 92.5 FM
São Paulo – 780 AM and 90.5 FM
Cidade do Aço - 103.3 FM - Rio de Janeiro - Pop
Clube Cidade – 94.1 FM – Porto Velho, Rondônia
Costa Verde - 91.7 FM - Rio de Janeiro - Variety
Cultura – AM and 103.3 FM – São Paulo - Classical
Eldorado – 700 AM and 92.9 FM – São Paulo - Jazz, MPB, classic rock
Energia 97 FM - 97.7 FM – São Paulo
Transamérica – 100.1 FM – São Paulo, also broadcasts throughout Brazil
JK
Rádio Jovem FM 98.7 MHz – Itajubá, Minas Gerais
Jovem Pan – (Largest Latin American radio network with more than 100 affiliates).
Jovem Pan FM – (Leader in audience in Brazil, present in more than 54 Brazilian cities, the station belonging to Jovem Pan network)
Jovem Pan FM – 100.9 FM – São Paulo (Broadcaster that leads the Jovem Pan network)
Kiss FM – 102.1 FM – São Paulo - Classic rock
Metropolitana FM – 98.5 FM – São Paulo
Mix (Rádio) – 106.3 FM – São Paulo
Mix 93.7 FM – João Pessoa
Morena FM 98.7 FM ] – Itabuna
Nativa FM – Alegrete, Rio Grande do Sul
Nova Brasilia
Numero 1 FM – Salvador, Bahia
Piatá FM – 94.3 FM – pop – Salvador, Bahia
Radio 105 – across Brazil
Rádio Caxias – Caixas do Sul, Rio Grande do Sul
Rádio Capital – Brasília, Federal District
Rádio Colombo
Rádio Cultural
Rádio Energia – FM
Rádio Fênix – Online radio (radio dedicated to the Japanese population in Brazil)
Rádio FM 98.6?
Rádio Globo, AM and FM – Globo's radio station – Variety
Rádio Inconfidência – pop, sports – Belo Horizonte, Minas Gerais
Rádio Internacional de Caixas? – Caixas do Sul, Rio Grande do Sul
Radio Noturno – 93.3 FM – Frutal, Minas Gerais
Rádio Prudente – Presidente Prudente, São Paulo
Rádio Renascença – Cajuru?, São Paulo
Rádio Rondônia – Polim, Rondônia
Radio Roquette Pinto – 94.1 FM - Rio de Janeiro
Super Radio Brasilia – 88.9 FM & 1210 AM Brasília
Super Rádio Tupi – 1280 AM – Rio de Janeiro
Top FM – 104.1 FM Guarulhos, SP
USP FM – 93.7 FM São Paulo

Canada

 List of radio stations in Alberta
 List of radio stations in British Columbia
 List of radio stations in Manitoba
 List of radio stations in New Brunswick
 List of radio stations in Newfoundland and Labrador
 List of radio stations in the Northwest Territories
 List of radio stations in Nova Scotia
 List of radio stations in Nunavut
 List of radio stations in Ontario
 List of radio stations in Prince Edward Island
 List of radio stations in Quebec
 List of radio stations in Saskatchewan
 List of radio stations in Yukon

Chile

Main Commercial Networks 

 13 Radios
 Radio Horizonte
 Oasis FM
 Play FM
 Sonar FM
 Top FM
 Bio Bio Comunicaciones
 Radio Bio Bio
 Punto 7 Radio
 Radio El Carbon
 Compañia Chilena de Comunicaciones
 Radio Cooperativa
 Radio Universo
 El Mercurio S.A.P
 Digital FM
 Positiva FM
 Grupo Bezanilla
 FM Tiempo
 Radio Infinita
 Romántica FM
 Grupo Dial
 Duna FM
 Paula FM
 Radio Beethoven
 Radio Carolina
 Radio Disney
 Radio Zero (Chile)
 Iberoamericana Radio Chile
 ADN Radio Chile
 Corazón FM
 FM Dos
 Los 40 Principales (Chile)
 Radioactiva (Chile)
 Radio Concierto
 Radio Futuro
 Radio Imagina
 Radio Pudahuel
 Radio Uno (Chile)
 Rock & Pop (Chile)

Independent Radio Stations with national coverage

 El Conquistador FM
 Radio Agricultura
 Radio Armonia 
 Radio Carnaval
 Radio Maria (Chile)
 Radio Nuevo Mundo

Locales

 Radio Austral (Chile) (AM) (Valdivia)
 Radio San Bartolome – Regional coverage in the Coquimbo Region (FM)

Colombia

Bogotá

Main commercial networks
Caracol Radio
W Radio
Radioacktiva
La Vallenata
Tropicana Estéreo
RCN Radio
La Mega
La F. M.
Radio Uno
Rumba Estéreo
Amor Estéreo
Caracol Televisión
Blu Radio
Todelar
La Z
La X
Cadena Super
SuperEstación – 88.9 – Rock
Colmundo
WV Radio
Candela Estéreo
Vibra FM

Non commercial
Radiodifusora Nacional de Colombia (RTVC) 95.9
Radiónica (website) 99.1
UN Radio (Colombia) (National University of Colombia) – 98.5 –  Jazz, Classical, News, Pop, Rock, World Music, Colombian Traditional, Salsa, Vallenato
Javeriana Estéreo (Pontificia Universidad Javeriana) – 91.9 – Jazz, Classical, Pop, Rock, World Music, Colombian Traditional, Salsa, Vallenato

Cuba

Ecuador
Radio Publica de Ecuador – 100.9 FM Pichincha (National Radio)
 CRE Satelital – 560 AM Quito
 HCJB La Voz de los Andes – 89.3 FM, 690 AM & 6050 SW Pichincha (Christian Radio)
Radio Quito – 760 AM Quito
 Radio Sucre – 700 AM Guayaquil
 Radio Vision – 91.7 FM Quito / 107.7 FM Guayaquil
 Radio EnergiaFm – www.energiafm.com.ec

Falkland Islands
 Falkland Islands Radio Service
 KTV Radio Nova
 BFBS Radio
 BBC World Service

Guyana

Honduras 
Main radio stations: 

 Musiquera (93.3 FM San Pedro Sula; 105.3 FM Tegucigalpa) National coverage.
 Radioactiva (99.7 FM San Pedro Sula; 91.1 FM Danlí)
 Estéreo Clase (92.9 FM San Pedro Sula; 92.9 FM Puerto Cortés)
 Radio Nacional de Honduras (101.3 FM Tegucigalpa; 880 AM Santa Rosa de Copán) Public.
 Radio País (106.5 FM Tegucigalpa)
 Radio Globo (88.5 FM Tegucigalpa; 104.5 San Pedro Sula) National coverage.

Mexico
Lists by state:
 List of radio stations in Aguascalientes
 List of radio stations in Baja California
 List of radio stations in Campeche
 List of radio stations in Chiapas
 List of radio stations in Chihuahua
 List of radio stations in Coahuila
 List of radio stations in Colima
 List of radio stations in Jalisco
 List of radio stations in Mexico City
 List of radio stations in the State of Mexico
 List of radio stations in Morelos
 List of radio stations in Nuevo León
 List of radio stations in Puebla
 List of radio stations in Querétaro
 List of radio stations in San Luis Potosí
 List of radio stations in Sinaloa
 List of radio stations in Sonora
 List of radio stations in Tamaulipas
 List of radio stations in Tlaxcala
 List of radio stations in Veracruz
 List of radio stations in Zacatecas

Notes:

Paraguay

Peru
 Radio Nacional del Peru – 103.9 FM & 850 AM Lima (National Coverage)
 Doble Nueve – 99.1 FM Lima (Rock)
 Filarmonía 102,7 (Classic) 
 La Kalle 95,5 
 La Karibeña 94,9 – FM Lima (Cumbia & Tropical Music)
 Nueva Q 107,1 – [National Coverage] (Cumbia Music)
 Onda Cero 98,1 – 98.1 FM Lima + National Coverage (Cumbia Music)
 Oxígeno – 102.1 FM Lima + National Coverage (80s Pop) 
 Panamericana Radio – 101.1 FM Lima + National Coverage
 Radio Antena Sur – 90.3 FM Huancayo (Andean Folk Music)
 Radio Capital – 96.7 FM & 1470 AM Lima + National Coverage
 Radio Felicidad
 Radio Huanta 2000 – 92.9 FM, 1160 AM & 4747 kHz Huanta
 Radio Logos – 4810 SW Chazuta
 Radio Mágica – 88.3 FM Lima (60's & 70's Music)
 Radio María 97.7 FM & 580 AM + National Coverage (Website)
 Radio Ondas del Huallaga – 88.9 FM, 1350 AM & 3330 SW Huanuco
 Radio Planeta – 107.7 FM Lima, 95.1 FM Arequipa & 90.9 FM Asia (English Pop Music)
 Radio San Borja – 91.1 FM Lima
 Radio Tarma – 99.3 FM, 1510 AM & 4775 SW Tarma
 Radio Vision – 4790 SW Chiclayo
 Ritmo Romántica (Romantic)
 RPP – 89.7 FM & 730 AM Lima + National Coverage (Website)
 Sol – Frecuencia Primera RTVN (Internet Radio Station)

South Georgia and the South Sandwich Islands
 Radio South Georgia and South Sandwich Islands
 BBC World Service
 Falkland Islands Radio Service

Suriname
 RadioApintie – FM 97.1, FM 91.7

Trinidad and Tobago

United States
As of August 2007, the FCC had licensed 4779 AM stations and 9159 FM stations (6279 commercial and 2880 educational).

 Lists of radio stations in United States
 Sortable list of sports radio stations in the United States
 List of jazz radio stations in the United States

Uruguay

 Radiodifusion Nacional Uruguay
 Radio Uruguay – 1050 AM
 Emisora del Sur – 1290 AM/94.7 FM
 Babel FM – 97.1 FM
 Radio Clasica – 650 AM

Venezuela

 Radio Nacional de Venezuela
 RNV Canal Informativo
 RNV Juvenil (Activa)
 RNV Canal Clasico
 RNV Canal Musical
 RNV Canal Indigena
 RNV Radio Local:
 RNV Portuguesa
 RNV Los Llanos
 RNV Region Central
 RNV Zulia
 RNV Anzoategui

Notes and references

See also
List of South American Spanish-speaking local radio stations
Lists of radio stations in Africa
Lists of radio stations in Asia
Lists of radio stations in Europe
Lists of radio stations in Oceania

External links
Panama Radio Stations
FMLIST worldwide database of FM stations
FMSCAN worldwide FM reception prediction
MWLIST worldwide database of MW and LW stations
MWSCAN worldwide MW and SW reception prediction
Radio en América Latina

Radio stations